Concino Concini, 1st Marquis d'Ancre (23 November 1569 – 24 April 1617), was an Italian politician, best known for being a minister of Louis XIII of France, as the favourite of Louis's mother, Marie de Medici, Queen of France. In 1617 he was killed on the behest of the King.

First minister

A Florentine nobleman, Concini was born in the capital city of the Tuscany region (23 November 1569). He went to France with Maria de Medici, wife of Henri IV, in the year 1600. The queen's lady-in-waiting, Leonora Dori, known as "Galigaï", having already been his wife. It is generally thought that the favour his wife enjoyed with the queen, combined with his wit and boldness, contributed to make Concini's fortune. In 1610, he purchased the marquisate of Ancre and the position of First Gentleman-in-waiting. Then he obtained successively the governments of Amiens and of Normandy, governor of Péronne, Roye and Montdidier and, in 1613, the baton of Marshal of France.

From then first minister of the realm, he abandoned the policy of Henri IV, compromised his wise legislation, allowed the treasury to be pillaged, and drew upon himself the hatred of all classes. The nobles were bitterly hostile to him, particularly Henry II de Bourbon, Prince of Condé, with whom he negotiated the Treaty of Loudun in 1616, and whom he had arrested in September 1616. This was done on the advice of Cardinal de Richelieu, whose introduction into politics was favoured by Concini.

Rise to power
Concini's political power did not commence as early as 1610. From 1610 to 1614, he and his wife settled for expanding their fortune via Galigaï's close relation with the queen. As the queen's closest adviser she and her husband were financially rewarded. With this wealth Concini established himself the marquisate of Ancre in 1610 and three years later in 1613 a marshal's baton. During these years however, most of the political power remained in the hands of minister Nicolas de Neufville de Villeroy. Between 1614 and 1616 his political influence expanded, being involved in Spanish marriages and his interference with rebelling princes. In 1615 we can see an increase in criticism towards Concini in the spread of negative pamphlets. Since the Peace of Loudun we can see Concini wielding a true political power over the French kingdom. The couple aimed to strengthen royal authority by disbanding Henry IV's old ministers and having the prince of Condé incarcerated. A new ministry was formed with Claude Mangot as keeper of the seals, Claude Barbin as minister of finance and Cardinal Richelieu as foreign minister.

Assassination
By 1617, Louis XIII, incited by his favourite Charles de Luynes, was tired of Concini's tutelage. Nicolas de L'Hôpital, as head of the royal guards, received in the King's name the order to imprison him.

According to some authors, young Louis XIII agreed that Concini could be killed if he resisted. Apprehended on the bridge of the Louvre castle, Concini was killed by guards after allegedly calling out "À moi !" ("To me!") for help, which was interpreted as resistance. The action was the result of a secret plot organised by Louis XIII king of France and Charles de Luynes, which was then executed by the Baron of Vitry. Concini had to be eliminated because he was perceived by Louis XIII as a menace—a powerful politician, having a personal army of 7,000 soldiers and important supporters and contacts among the aristocrats of France. After his murder, the Queen Mother was ordered to retire to Blois.

Concini's wife, Leonora Dori, was arrested, imprisoned in Blois and accused of sorcery. She was beheaded and her body subsequently burned at the stake on July 8 of the same year in Place de Grève, Paris. Concini's son, Henry, born in 1605, fled France and died in 1631 in Florence. The Concinis' chattels and estates, in particular the castle of Lésigny and the palace of Rue de Tournon, were confiscated by King Louis XIII and given to Charles de Luynes.

In 1617–1618, many rumours and pamphlets were distributed in Paris to justify Concini’s murder.

Historiography
In 1767, D. Sandellius published at Brescia, De Concini vita, On the role of Concini, see the Histoire de France, published under the direction of Ernest Lavisse, vol. vi. (1905), by Mariejol.

References

External links 

https://web.archive.org/web/20070324141816/http://www.uni-mannheim.de/mateo/camenaref/cmh/cmh404.html
https://web.archive.org/web/20060811120545/http://www.bartleby.com/65/ma/MariedeM.html
https://web.archive.org/web/20070324141816/http://www.uni-mannheim.de/mateo/camenaref/cmh/cmh404.html
https://web.archive.org/web/20120205154045/http://www.h-france.net/vol5reviews/kettering2.html
http://www.baroque.it/personaggi/luigiXIII.htm
http://cronologia.leonardo.it/storia/aa1610.htm
https://web.archive.org/web/20070928001351/http://www.materialismo.it/Sintesi%20libri/ministoria_della_censura.htm

Marshals of France
French royal favourites
1569 births
1617 deaths
Politicians from Florence
Louis XIII
Italian people murdered abroad
People murdered in Paris
16th-century Italian politicians
17th-century Italian politicians
Court of Louis XIII
Murder in 1617
Emigrants from the Grand Duchy of Tuscany to France